This is a list of American crime podcasts. True crime podcasts were popularized in the United States by Serial, which debuted in 2014.

List

See also
List of Australian crime podcasts

References

Crime podcasts
Lists of podcasts
American podcasts